Sudarshan News is an Indian right-wing news channel. It was founded in 2005 by Suresh Chavhanke, the chairman and editor-in-chief.
Chavhanke was a long-term volunteer of the Hindu nationalist organisation Rashtriya Swayamsevak Sangh (RSS), also associating with Akhil Bharatiya Vidyarthi Parishad, the student wing of RSS. He asserts that he practices ideology-driven journalism and prefers that the news programs on his channel be viewed as opinionated campaigns.

The channel has been widely criticised for blatant communal broadcasting.

Reception

Hate speech 
In April 2017, Chavhanke was arrested for allegedly inciting communal hatred through multiple episodes of a flagship program. He secured bail two days later.

In 2020, Hemant Soren, the Chief Minister of Jharkhand, ordered state police to take action against Chavhanke for this hate speech.

Chavhanke claims to have contributed towards the ochlocratic atmosphere that led to police complaints and death threats against M. F. Husain for allegedly violating Hindu sentiments. As a result, Husain left India on a self-imposed exile until his death.

Alleged Anti-Muslim fear-mongering propaganda 
Dissemination of anti-Muslim content to manufacturing actual news with neutral overtones has been alleged. Critics allege the channel as "bigoted" and "dangerous" for its communal-toned fake news. Hilal Ahmed, a professor of Centre for the Study of Developing Societies, alleges a call for extrajudicial lynching of Muslims, who refused to chant a particular slogan in praise of the motherland, whilst discussing the context of Islamophobic discourse in media and its role in creating the stereotypical image of Indian Muslims.

In June 2018, the Delhi Minorities Commission issued a notice to the channel after it broadcast a program that claimed a Muslim-dominated region was inhabited by illegal Bangladeshi and Rohingya infiltrators.

On 25 August 2020, a Sudarshan News trailer uploaded by Suresh Chavhanke suggesting that Muslim students were infiltrating administrative services as "UPSC jihad," became viral. It was heavily condemned, including by former senior bureaucrats, judges, and the Home Minister. Broadcast of the actual TV programme was stayed by the Delhi High Court and the matter is sub-judice.

Fake news 
On multiple occasions, Sudarshan News was found to be spreading fake news. In 2019, the channel broadcast an old video, which was morphed with slogans calling for the killings of RSS workers. In 2014, fake quotes were attributed to Shahrukh Khan by the news channel. During the Delhi riots of 2020, the channel was found to be spreading communally charged fake news.

References

External links

Hindi-language television channels in India
Television channels and stations established in 2007
24-hour television news channels in India
Hindutva